Matamata College is a co-educational state secondary school located in Matamata, New Zealand.

History

The college was declared open on 11 February 1924 by the Minister for Education, James Parr. 

In July 2012, a student was killed by a train after he ran out from several trees alongside the tracks outside the school; He was killed instantly.

Notable alumni

Anne Taylor – netball player
Brendon Leonard – rugby union player
Casey Williams – netball player
Catherine Tizard – Governor-General
Craig Innes – rugby union and rugby league player
Judith Collins – politician; former National leader
Julie Hawkes – squash player 
Lyn Grime – Olympic hurdler
Murray Taylor – rugby union player
Nicola Browne – cricketer
Richard Nunns – Māori traditional instrumentalist of Pākehā heritage
Shane Dye – jockey
Warwick Taylor – rugby union player

Historic imagery

References

External links
 Matamata College

Educational institutions established in 1918
Secondary schools in Waikato
Matamata
1918 establishments in New Zealand